Joseph Steele Crail (December 25, 1877 – March 2, 1938) was a United States representative from California. He was born in Fairfield, Iowa. He attended the public schools and graduated from Drake University in Des Moines, Iowa in 1898.

During the Spanish–American War, Crail enlisted as a private in the Twelfth Company, United States Volunteer Signal Corps. He was promoted to corporal and served in the American Army of Occupation in Cuba until its withdrawal. He studied law at the Iowa College of Law, and was admitted to the bar in 1903 and commenced practice in Fairfield, Iowa.  In 1912 he was an unsuccessful candidate for Congress from the district which included Fairfield, running as an affiliate of the Progressive Party.

Crail moved to California in 1913, settled in Los Angeles, and practiced law until elected to Congress. He served as chairman of the Republican State central committee for southern California 1918–20. He was elected as a Republican to the Seventieth, Seventy-first, and Seventy-second Congresses (March 4, 1927 – March 3, 1933). He was not a candidate for renomination in 1932, but was an unsuccessful candidate for nomination as United States Senator. He resumed the practice of law but also engaged in banking. He died in Los Angeles, California in 1938. He was buried in Inglewood Park Mausoleum, Inglewood, California.

References

External links

1877 births
1938 deaths
People from Fairfield, Iowa
Drake University alumni
University of Iowa College of Law alumni
California lawyers
Iowa Republicans
Republican Party members of the United States House of Representatives from California